Nels Fredrick Solomon Ferré was a Christian theologian born in Luleå, Sweden on June 8, 1908.

Life

Nels F.S Ferré, born Nils Ferré, was born in Sweden in 1908 to Maria Wickman Ferré and Frans August Ferré and emigrated to The United States alone at age 13. Upon his arrival on Ellis Island, he was detained and later joined his brother in St. Paul Minnesota where he would work for a family farm. In 1931 he graduated with his undergrad from Boston University. In 1932, Ferré married Katharine Louise Pond. With his interest in philosophy and theology, Ferré would pursue a D.B. degree at Andover Newton, graduating with the class of 1934. He would go on to receive his A.M. and Ph.D. degrees from Harvard University in 1936 and 1938 respectively.

Career
From 1937 to 1950 Ferré taught as a professor at Andover Newton Seminary and from 1950-1957 he was a professor at Vanderbilt University at the School of Religion. From 1957 to 1964, Ferré returned to Andover. Ferré published many books on Christian theology in his career. The common theme of his books was love being the primary category of life. He believed this due to his immense belief in God and belief that God is love. His work primarily revolved around his belief in God and how he interpreted the views of Christianity.  In 1958, his book titled "Christ and the Christian" brought a lot of controversy over concepts such as the virgin birth. Those who didn't support him went out and protested. These people took actions such as radio attacks, burning effigies of Ferré, and even pulling speaking invitations. Ferré died in 1971. Ferré wrote over 30 books in his lifetime.

Selected works
 The Christian Faith, 1942
 Faith and Reason, 1946
 Strengthening the Spiritual Life 1951
 The Sun and the Umbrella 1953
 God’s New Age A Book Of Sermons, 1956
 Reason in Religion, 1963
 The Living God of Nowhere and Nothing, 1967
 The Universal Word: A Theology for a Universal Faith, 1969

Honors, awards, and positions

Appointed by Andover Newton Theological School in 1939 to Abbott Professorship of Systematic Theology
Appointed by Vanderbilt University Divinity School in 1950 as Professor of Philosophical & Systematic Theology
Returned to Abbott Professorship at Andover Newton Theological School in 1957
Appointed by Parsons College, Fairfield, Iowa, in 1965 as Scholar in Residence
Appointed by The College of Wooster, Wooster, Ohio, in 1968 as Professor of Philosophy

References

Library Thing entry for Nels F. S. Ferré
An Inventory of His Papers
American Journal of Theology & Philosophy
The Journal of Religion
Nels F. S. Ferré on Ultimate Reality and the Meaning of Human Life

1908 births
1971 deaths
Andover Newton Theological School faculty
Boston University alumni
College of Wooster faculty
Harvard University alumni
People from Luleå
Swedish theologians
Vanderbilt University faculty